The term blue dwarf may refer to:

Astronomical objects
 A blue compact dwarf galaxy
 An early-type main-sequence star
 B-type main-sequence star
 O-type main sequence star
 Blue dwarf (red-dwarf stage), a hypothetical stage in red dwarf interstellar evolution

See also
 Blue star (disambiguation)
 Blue giant (disambiguation)